Dimitri Petrov (born 10 February 1932, died September 2020) was a Bulgarian cross-country skier. He competed in the men's 15 kilometre event at the 1956 Winter Olympics.

References

External links
 

1932 births
Living people
Bulgarian male cross-country skiers
Olympic cross-country skiers of Bulgaria
Cross-country skiers at the 1956 Winter Olympics
Place of birth missing (living people)